Hyperolius mosaicus is a species of frog in the family Hyperoliidae. It is found in Cameroon and Gabon, presumably also in the Republic of the Congo and Equatorial Guinea, and possibly in the western Central African Republic.
Its natural habitat is tropical moist lowland forests. It is an uncommon, strictly arboreal species that breeds using water in tree holes. Presumably, it is threatened by habitat loss caused by logging, agriculture, and human settlements.

References

mosaicus
Frogs of Africa
Amphibians of Cameroon
Amphibians of Gabon
Amphibians described in 1959
Taxa named by Jean-Luc Perret
Taxonomy articles created by Polbot